(David) Eifion Evans (22 January 1911 – 23 May 1997) was Archdeacon of Cardigan from 1967 to 1979.

Evans was educated at the University College of Wales and St. Michael's College, Llandaff; and ordained in 1935. After curacies in Llanfihangel-ar-Arth and Llanbadarn Fawr he was a Chaplain to the British Armed Forces during World War II. held incumbencies at Spittal, Llangadog, After this he held incumbencies at Penrhyncoch  and  Aberystwyth before his appointment as Archdeacon. His son, Wyn Evans, was bishop of St Davids from 2008 To 2016.

References

1911 births
1997 deaths
Alumni of Aberystwyth University
Alumni of St Michael's College, Llandaff
Welsh military chaplains
Archdeacons of Cardigan